A Russian census is a census of the population of Russia. Such a census has occurred at various irregular points in the history of Russia.

Introduced in 1897 during the Russian Empire, the census took place decennially since 2010 according to the UN standards. Preparing and organizing the census is under the authority of the Federal State Statistics Service, branch of the Ministry of Economic Development since 2017.

History

See also
Demographics of Russia

Notes

References

Demographics of Russia